Bob Kurtz, founder of Kurtz & Friends Animation, is a director, producer, artist, and designer who primarily works in films and TV commercials. He attended the Chouinard Art Institute. He has taught at the character animation program at the California Institute of the Arts.

Selected filmography

Director / writer / designer / producer
Harold And His Amazing Green Plants" 1984

sequences theaterical feature films
 Max Dugan Returns (1983)
 Jetsons: The Movie (1990) (You & Me animation sequence)
 City Slickers (1991) (also for City Slickers II)
 Honey, I Blew Up The Kid (1992)
 Honeymoon in Vegas (1992)
 Straight Talk (1992)
 Jurassic Park (1993) ("Mr. DNA" animated sequences)
 City Slickers II (1994)
 Four Rooms (1995)
 George of the Jungle (1997)
 Minority Report (2002) ("Pine & Oats" animated sequence)
 The Pink Panther (2006)
 Are We Done Yet? (2007)
 Gambitt (2012)

Other
 The Way Things Work (3D-3 screen experience at Sony's Metreon)
 Chevron ("Dinosaur" commercial)
 Clubhouse (network ID's for German children's channel) (designer only)
 Junior (network ID's for German children's channel) (designer only)
 Sesame Street ("My Various Me's", "Lincoln Park Zoo", and "More Moths" animated sequences)
 Schoolhouse Rock! Earth ("Tiny Urban Zoo" scene)

TV
 The Roman City (1994 TV movie) (animated version of the David Macaulay book) (Best Primetime Animation Emmy)
 Edith Ann's Christmas: Just Say Noël (1996, TV movie) (Lily Tomlin special) (Peabody Award winner)
 Carlin on Campus (1984) ("Drawing on My Mind" animated sequences)

Awards
Winner of over 250 major awards including:
Peabody Award
Primetime Emmy Award for Outstanding Animated Program, 1994 
Winsor McCay Award for Lifetime Achievement, 1991 
Clio Awards 
International Festival of Short Films - Annecy, France
U.S. Television & Film Festival - New York
Ottawa/Hamilton Canadian International Animation Festival
Chicago International Film Festival
Society of Illustrators - New York
London Television Advertising Awards
Andy Awards
Telly Awards

References

External links
 
Kurtz & Friends Animation web site 
Bio at Chuckjones.com

Year of birth missing (living people)
Living people
American animators
American film directors
American film producers
American animated film directors
American animated film producers
California Institute of the Arts faculty
Chouinard Art Institute alumni
Primetime Emmy Award winners
Film and television title designers